Azerbaijan women's national kabaddi team represents Azerbaijan in women's kabaddi events.

Tournament history

2014 Kabaddi World Cup, group stage

Pool A

 Qualified for semifinals

External links
Azerbaijan vs Denmark | Women's | Day 4 | 5th World Cup Kabaddi Punjab 2014;
USA vs Azerbaijan | Women's | Day 8 | 5th World Cup Kabaddi Punjab 2014;
India vs Azerbaijan | Women's | Day 9 | 5th World Cup Kabaddi Punjab 2014.

Kabaddi
National women's kabaddi teams
Women's national kabaddi team